A reunion dinner (or) is held on New Year's Eve of the Chinese and Vietnamese New Years, during which family members get together to celebrate. It is often considered the most important get-together meal of the entire year.

Typical menu
The New Year's Eve dinner is very large and traditionally includes dumplings, chicken, and pork. Fish (魚, yú; Vietnamese: Con cá) is also included, but intentionally (except for Vietnam) not finished, and the remaining fish is stored overnight. The reason for this stems from a pun, as the Chinese phrase 年年有魚/餘; (nián nián yǒu yú, or "every year there is fish/leftover") is a homophone for phrases which mean "be blessed every year" or "have abundant profit every year". Similarly, a type of black hair-like algae, "fat choy"(髮菜, fǎ cài, literally "hair vegetable" in Chinese), is also featured in many dishes since its name sounds similar to "prosperity"(發財, fā cái). Hakka will serve "kiu nyuk" 扣肉 and "ngiong tiu fu" 釀豆腐. The belief is that having one will lead to the other, as the phrases sound similar to one another.

See also
 List of dining events

References

External links
Chinese New Year Reunion Dinner 

Chinese culture
Vietnamese culture
Chinese New Year
Dinner
Chinese New Year foods
Dinner
Dining events